This is a list of yearly Michigan Collegiate Conference football standings.

Standings

References

Michigan Collegiate Conference
Standings
Michigan Collegiate Conference football standings